Treasure in the Royal Tower is the fourth installment in the Nancy Drew point-and-click adventure game series by Her Interactive. The game is available for play on Microsoft Windows platforms. It has an ESRB rating of E for moments of mild violence and peril. Players take on the first-person view of fictional amateur sleuth Nancy Drew and must solve the mystery through interrogation of suspects, solving puzzles, and discovering clues. There are two levels of gameplay, Junior and Senior detective modes, each offering a different difficulty level of puzzles and hints, however neither of these changes affect the actual plot of the game. The game was loosely based on a book titled The Treasure in the Royal Tower (1995).

Plot
Nancy Drew is snowed-in at the Wickford Castle Ski Resort in Wisconsin. Not long after she arrived, the castle's historic library was vandalized, and one of the guests was shouting that her room had been robbed. The castle was originally owned by a millionaire who had Marie Antoinette’s tower from the Château Rochemont in France taken apart and rebuilt into Wickford Castle, but the entrance is hidden and sealed off. Nancy needs to explore the castle for clues and find her way into the Queen's tower.

Development

Characters
Nancy Drew - Nancy is an 18-year-old amateur detective from the fictional town of River Heights in the United States. She is the only playable character in the game, which means the player must solve the mystery from her perspective.
Dexter Egan - Dexter was an orphan who was adopted by the castle's original owner, millionaire Ezra Wickford. Dexter grew up in the castle and now resides there as the caretaker. Are there secrets about the castle that he's trying to hide?
Jacques Brunais - Jacques is a former French Olympic skier who has now retired as a ski instructor at Wickford Castle. He has a fiancé named Isabelle whom he is very eager to marry. His great grandfather helped prepare the castle's tower for shipment to Wisconsin, so perhaps his ties to the castle run deeper than meets the eye.
Lisa Ostrum - Lisa is a photojournalist who is at the castle to write an article about old Midwestern mansions. She loves to gossip about the other people in the castle, and she seems very interested in the castle's tower. Could she have an ulterior motive for picking this castle for her story?
Professor Beatrice Hotchkiss - Professor Hotchkiss is an eccentric woman who was robbed but refuses to leave her room to talk to anyone about what happened. Chatty and knowledgeable, she is a scholar of French History specializing in Marie Antoinette. Is she trying to keep the treasure hidden by the doomed queen for herself?

Cast
Nancy Drew - Lani Minella
Dexter Egan - Thomas Stewart
Jacques Brunais - Justin Barrett
Lisa Ostrum - Tara V. Smith
Professor Beatrice Hotchkiss - Keri Healey
Ned Nickerson - Scott Carty
Bess Marvin - Claire Gallagher
George Fayne - Maureen Nelson

Reception

According to PC Data, Treasure in the Royal Tower sold 42,363 units in North America during 2001, and another 18,301 units in the first three months of 2002. Its sales in the region for the year 2003 totaled 36,847 units. In the United States alone, the game's computer version sold between 100,000 and 300,000 units by August 2006. Combined sales of the Nancy Drew adventure game series reached 500,000 copies in North America by early 2003, and the computer entries reached 2.1 million sales in the United States alone by August 2006. Remarking upon this success, Edge called Nancy Drew a "powerful franchise".

Treasure in the Royal Tower received a "Gold" Parents' Choice Award in fall 2001.

References

External links
Official site (archived)

2001 video games
Detective video games
Video games based on Nancy Drew
Video games scored by Kevin Manthei
Point-and-click adventure games
Video games developed in the United States
Video games set in Wisconsin
Windows games
Windows-only games
Her Interactive games
Single-player video games
North America-exclusive video games